A sideboard is an item of furniture.

Sideboard may also refer to:

Sideboard (Edward William Godwin), a sideboard designed by Edward William Godwin
Sideboard (cards), a deck of cards in a collectible card game
The Sideboard, a magazine about the Magic card game
The Sideboard, a painting by Antonio López García
"The Sideboard Song", a song by Chas & Dave
Sideburns, a style of facial hair